Avedon Carol is an American-born British feminist, anti-censorship, and civil liberties campaigner and a researcher in the field of sex crime, residing in England. She is a member of Feminists Against Censorship, and as part of their publishing group co-edited Bad Girls & Dirty Pictures (1993). She is the author of Nudes, Prudes and Attitudes (1994), and has also worked on other books by Feminists Against Censorship. On her own website, "Avedon's Sideshow", she publishes and compiles links to a wide array of stories and events.

Avedon is one of 12 media panelists for Virtually Speaking Sundays, a weekly podcast discussing (mostly US) current events.

A well-known figure in science fiction fandom, Avedon was the 1983 winner of the Trans Atlantic Fan Fund, and has been nominated for three Hugo Awards (1989, 1991 and 1992) as Best Fan Writer for her contributions to science fiction fanzines and as an active member of the Amateur Press Associations AWA (A Women's APA) in the US and TWP (The Women's Periodical) in Britain. She was Fan Guest of Honour at Wiscon in Madison, Wisconsin in 1987 and at the British Eastercons in Glasgow in 1983 (Albacon II) and on Jersey in 1989 (Contrivance).

Biography 
She was born in Maryland, growing up in Kensington, but now resides in London. She runs a political blog at avedoncarol.blogspot.com.

Bibliography

See also 
 Sex-positive feminism
 Alison Assiter

References

External links 

 Avedon Carol's homepage
 Avedon Carol at fiawol.demon.co.uk
 Avedon Carol, FAC at fiawol.demon.co.uk
 Blog Talk Radio
 Glen Ford and Avedon Carol speaking with Jay Ackroyd, Blog Talk Radio

Living people
American feminists
People from Kensington, Maryland
Sex-positive feminists
University of Maryland, College Park alumni
Year of birth missing (living people)
American emigrants to England
British feminist writers